Patrick Reid may refer to:

Patrick Reid (Medal of Honor) (1875–?), United States sailor
T. Patrick Reid (born 1943), Canadian politician
Pat Reid (1910–1990), World War II British escape officer; postwar attaché, civil engineer and author 
Pat Reid (Canadian football), Canadian football player
Paddy Reid (1924–2016), Irish dual code rugby player